Aleš Mandous (born 21 April 1992) is a Czech professional footballer who plays as a goalkeeper for Slavia Prague.

Club career

Viktoria Plzeň
On 23 March 2013, Mandous made his competitive debut in the second leg of the fourth round of the Czech Cup against Hradec Králové. Plzeň won the game 1-0 and advanced to the next round.

FK Bohemians Prague (Strizkov)
He spent the following season on loan at Bohemians Prague (Střížkov). Mandous played 18 games in this campaign, which ended with the club being relegated to the third flight of Czech football.

Baník Most
In the summer of 2014, he was sent on loan. This time he joined Baník Most, who were at that time in the second tier of Czech football. Mandous played in 18 matches and was relegated with the club in 2015.

MŠK Žilina
Mandous joined Žilina as a free agent in June 2015, when he signed a two-year contract with the club. On 12 August 2015, he made his competitive debut in the Slovak Cup match against ŠK Strážske, which Žilina won 9-0.

International career
On 4 June 2013, Mandous played his sole game for the Czech Under-21 team. In this match, the Czech Republic lost 3-0 to Austria.

In September 2020, Mandous was selected as one of 23 players called up to the national team due to the original squad having to quarantine due to exposure to Coronavirus. Mandous played the full 90 minutes for Czech Republic against Scotland which ended in a 1–2 defeat for the home side.

Career statistics

Club

International

References

External links
 
 Profile on mskzilina.sk 
 

1992 births
Living people
Czech footballers
Czech Republic international footballers
Czech Republic under-21 international footballers
Association football goalkeepers
SK Sigma Olomouc players
MŠK Žilina players
Slovak Super Liga players
2. Liga (Slovakia) players
Czech First League players
Czech National Football League players
Expatriate footballers in Slovakia
Czech expatriate sportspeople in Slovakia
People from Plzeň-North District
FK Bohemians Prague (Střížkov) players
FK Baník Most players
UEFA Euro 2020 players
Sportspeople from the Plzeň Region